Shōwachō Station may refer to:
 Shōwachō Station (Osaka), a train station on the Osaka Municipal Subway Midōsuji Line in Abeno-ku, Osaka, Japan
 Shōwachō Station (Kagawa), a train station on the JR Shikoku Kōtoku Line in Takamatsu, Kagawa Prefecture, Japan